Chornivka is a village in Chernivtsi Raion, Chernivtsi Oblast (province) of western Ukraine. It belongs to Chernivtsi urban hromada, one of the hromadas of Ukraine. It is located in  the historic region of Bukovina, approximately 22 km from the oblast capital, Chernivtsi.

The current estimated population is 2,340 (as of 2005).

As of 2005, the mayor was Gheorghe Bota.

History
Chornivka is home to the ancestral estate of the Hurmuzachi brothers, a well-known family of Romanian aristocrats, lawyers and historians from the 19th century. The mansion was transformed into a museum in October 1999.

In the 17th century, the estate had been in the possession of the family of Ion Neculce, a Moldavian chronicler. It had come into the family's possession by marriage, as a wedding gift to Neculce's mother. It was then passed on to one of Neculce's sisters.

The oldest church, built by the Hurmuzachi family, dates back to 1852.

Until 18 July 2020, Chornivka belonged to Novoselytsia Raion. The raion was abolished in July 2020 as part of the administrative reform of Ukraine, which reduced the number of raions of Chernivtsi Oblast to three. The area of Novoselytsia Raion was split between Chernivtsi and Dnistrovskyi Raions, with Chornivka being transferred to Chernivtsi Raion.

See also
Eudoxiu Hurmuzachi

References

External links
  describes a visit to Cernauca in 2005; part of the history section is based on this article
Account card of Chornivka
Detailed history of Chornivka and Hurmuzachi family 

Villages in Chernivtsi Raion
Bukovina